Wintner is a surname. Notable people with the surname include:

 Aurel Wintner (1903–1958), mathematician; one of the founders of probabilistic number theory
 Robert Wintner, author and entrepreneur

See also
 Tintner
 Winter (surname)